The occupation of Istanbul (12 November 1918 – 4 October 1923), the capital of the Ottoman Empire, by British, French, Italian, and Greek forces, took place in accordance with the Armistice of Mudros, which ended Ottoman participation in the First World War. The first French troops entered the city on 12 November 1918, followed by British troops the next day. The Italian troops landed in Galata on 7 February 1919.

Allied troops occupied zones based on the existing divisions of Istanbul and set up an Allied military administration early in December 1918. The occupation had two stages: the initial phase in accordance with the Armistice gave way in 1920 to a more formal arrangement under the Treaty of Sèvres. Ultimately, the Treaty of Lausanne, signed on 24 July 1923, led to the end of the occupation. The last troops of the Allies departed from the city on 4 October 1923, and the first troops of the Ankara government, commanded by Şükrü Naili Pasha (3rd Corps), entered the city with a ceremony on 6 October 1923, which has been marked as the Liberation Day of Istanbul (Turkish: İstanbul'un Kurtuluşu) and is commemorated every year on its anniversary.

1918 saw the first time the city had changed hands since the Fall of Constantinople in 1453. Along with the Occupation of Smyrna, it spurred the establishment of the Turkish National Movement, leading to the Turkish War of Independence.

Background

The Ottomans estimated that the population of Istanbul in 1920 was between 800,000 and 1,200,000 inhabitants, having collected population statistics from the various religious bodies. The uncertainty in the figure reflects the uncounted population of war refugees and disagreements as to the boundaries of the city. Half or less were Muslim, the rest being largely Greek Orthodox, Armenian Orthodox, and Jewish; there had been a substantial Western European population before the war.

Legality of the occupation
The Armistice of Mudros of 30 October 1918, which ended Ottoman involvement in World , mentions the occupation of Bosporus fort and Dardanelles fort. That day, Somerset Gough-Calthorpe, the British signatory, stated the Triple Entente's position that they had no intention to dismantle the government or place it under military occupation by "occupying Constantinople". This verbal promise and lack of mention of the occupation of Istanbul in the armistice did not change the realities for the Ottoman Empire. Admiral Somerset Gough-Calthorpe puts the British position as "No kind of favour whatsoever to any Turk and to hold out no hope for them". The Ottoman side returned to the capital with a personal letter from Calthorpe, intended for Rauf Orbay, in which he promised on behalf of the British government that only British and French troops would be used in the occupation of the Straits fortifications. A small number of Ottoman troops could be allowed to stay on in the occupied areas as a symbol of sovereignty.

Military administration

The Allies began to occupy Ottoman territory soon after the Armistice of Mudros; 13 days later, a French brigade entered Istanbul, on 12 November 1918. The first British troops entered the city on the following day. Early in December 1918, Allied troops occupied sections of Istanbul and set up an Allied military administration.

On 7 February 1919, an Italian battalion with 19 officers and 740 soldiers landed at the Galata pier; one day later they were joined by 283 Carabinieri, commanded by Colonel Balduino Caprini. The Carabinieri assumed police tasks.

On 10 February 1919, the commission divided the city into three zones for police matters: Stambul (the old city) was assigned to the French, Pera-Galata to the British and Kadıköy and Scutari to the Italians. High Commissioner Admiral Somerset Gough-Calthorpe was assigned as the military adviser to Istanbul.

Establishing authority 

The British rounded up a number of members of the old establishment and interned them in Malta, awaiting their trial for alleged crimes during World . Calthorpe included only Turkish members of the Government of Tevfik Pasha and the military/political personalities. He wanted to send a message that a military occupation was in effect and failure to comply would end with harsh punishment. His position was not shared with other partners. The French Government's response to those accused was "distinction to disadvantage of Muslim-Turks while Bulgarian, Austrian and German offenders were as yet neither arrested nor molested". However, the government and the Sultan understood the message. In February 1919, Allies were informed that the Ottoman Empire was in compliance with its full apparatus to the occupation forces. Any source of conflict (including Armenian questions) would be investigated by a commission, to which neutral governments could attach two legal superintendents. Calthorpe's correspondence to Foreign Office was "The action undertaken for the arrests was very satisfactory, and has, I think, intimidated the Committee of Union and Progress of Constantinople".

Ottoman courts-martial

Calthorpe's message was fully noted by the Sultan. There was an eastern tradition of presenting gifts to the authority during serious conflicts, sometimes "falling of heads". There was no higher goal than preserving the integrity of the Ottoman Institution. If Calthorpe's anger could be calmed down by foisting the blame on a few members of the Committee of Union and Progress, the Ottoman Empire could thereby receive more lenient treatment at the Paris peace conference. The trials began in Istanbul on 28 April 1919. The prosecution presented "forty-two authenticated documents substantiating the charges therein, many bearing dates, identification of senders of the cipher telegrams and letters, and names of recipients." On 22 July, the court-martial found several defendants guilty of subverting constitutionalism by force and found them responsible for massacres. During its whole existence from 28 April 1919, to 29 March 1920, Ottoman trials were performed very poorly and with increasing inefficiency, as presumed guilty people were already intended as a sacrifice to save the Empire. However, as an occupation authority, the historical rightfulness of the Allies was at stake. Calthorpe wrote to London: "proving to be a farce and injurious to our own prestige and to that of the Turkish government". The Allies considered Ottoman trials as a travesty of justice, so Ottoman justice had to be replaced with Western justice by moving the trials to Malta as "International" trials. The "International" trials declined to use any evidence developed by the Ottoman tribunals. When the International trials were staged, Calthorpe was replaced by John de Robeck. John de Robeck said regarding the trials "that its findings cannot be held of any account at all." All of the Malta exiles were released.

A new movement 

Calthorpe was alarmed when he learned that the victor of Gallipoli had become the inspector general for Anatolia, and Mustafa Kemal's behavior during this period did nothing to improve matters. Calthorpe urged that Kemal be recalled. Thanks to friends and sympathizers of Mustafa Kemal's in government circles, a 'compromise' was developed whereby the power of the inspector general was curbed, at least on paper. "Inspector General" became a title that had no power to command. On 23 June 1919, Somerset Arthur Gough-Calthorpe began to understand Kemal and his role in the establishment of the Turkish national movement. He sent a report about Mustafa Kemal to the Foreign Office. His remarks were downplayed by George Kidson of the Eastern Department. Captain Hurst (British army) in Samsun warned Calthorpe one more time about the Turkish national movement, but his units were replaced with a brigade of Gurkhas.

Arthur Gough-Calthorpe was assigned to another position on 5 August 1919, and left Istanbul.

John de Robeck, August 1919–1922

In August 1919 John de Robeck replaced Somerset Arthur Gough-Calthorpe with the title of "Commander-in-Chief, Mediterranean, and High Commissioner at Constantinople". He was responsible for activities regarding Russia and Turkey (Ottoman Empire-Turkish national movement).

John de Robeck was very worried by the defiant mood of the Ottoman parliament. When 1920 arrived, he was concerned by reports that substantial stocks of arms were reaching Turkish National Movement, some from French and Italian sources. In one of his letters to London, he asked: "Against whom would these sources be employed?"

In London, the Conference of London (February 1920) took place; it featured discussions about settling the treaty terms to be offered in San Remo. John de Robeck reminded participants that Anatolia was moving into a resistance stage. There were arguments of "National Pact" (Misak-ı Milli) circulating, and if these were solidified, it would take a longer time and more resources to handle the case (partitioning of the Ottoman Empire). He tried to persuade the leaders to take quick action and control the Sultan and pressure the rebels (from both directions). This request posed awkward problems at the highest level: promises for national sovereignty were on the table and the United States was fast withdrawing into isolation.

Treaty of Sevres

Ottoman parliament of 1920

The newly elected Ottoman parliament in Istanbul did not recognize the occupation; they developed a National Pact (Misak-ı Milli). They adopted six principles, which called for self-determination, the security of Istanbul, the opening of the Straits, and the abolition of the capitulations. While in Istanbul self-determination and protection of the Ottoman Empire were voiced, the Khilafat Movement in India tried to influence the British government to protect the caliphate of the Ottoman Empire, and although it was mainly a Muslim religious movement, the Khilafat struggle was becoming a part of the wider Indian independence movement. Both these two movements (Misak-ı Milli and the Khilafat Movement) shared a lot of notions on the ideological level, and during the Conference of London (February 1920) Allies concentrated on these issues.

The Ottoman Empire lost World , but Misak-ı Milli with the local Khilafat Movement was still fighting the Allies.

Solidification of the partitioning, February 1920

The plans for partitioning of the Ottoman Empire needed to be solidified. At the Conference of London on 4 March 1920, the Triple Entente decided to implement its previous (secret) agreements and form what would be the Treaty of Sèvres. In doing so, all forms of resistance originating from the Ottoman Empire (rebellions, Sultan, etc.) had to be dismantled. The Allies' military forces in Istanbul ordered that the necessary actions be taken; also the political side increased efforts to put the Treaty of Sèvres into writing.

On the political side, negotiations for the Treaty of Sèvres presumed a Greek (Christian administration), a French-Armenian (Christian administration), Italian occupation region (Christian administration) and Wilsonian Armenia (Christian administration) over what was the Ottoman Empire (Muslim administration). Muslim citizens of the Ottoman Empire perceived this plan as depriving them of sovereignty. British intelligence registered the Turkish national movement as a movement of the Muslim citizens of Anatolia. The Muslim unrest all around Anatolia brought two arguments to the British government regarding the new establishments: the Muslim administration (Ottoman Empire) was not safe for Christians; the Treaty of Sèvres was the only way that Christians could be safe. Enforcing the Treaty of Sèvres could not happen without repressing Mustafa Kemal's national movement.

On the military side the British claimed that if the Allies could not control Anatolia at that time, they could at least control Istanbul. The plan was step by step beginning from Istanbul, dismantle every organization and slowly move deep into Anatolia. That meant facing what will be called the Turkish War of Independence. The British foreign department was asked to devise a plan to ease this path, and developed the same plan that they had used during the Arab revolt. This policy of breaking down authority by separating the Sultan from his government, and working different millets against each other, such as the Christian millet against the Muslim millet, was the best solution if minimal British force was to be used.

Military occupation of Istanbul

Dissolution of the parliament, March 1920

The Telegram House was occupied by Allied troops on 14 March. On the morning of 16 March, British forces, including the Indian Army, began to occupy the key buildings and arrest nationalist politicians and journalists. An Indian Army operation, the Şehzadebaşı raid, resulted in 5 Ottoman Army soldiers from the 10th Infantry Division being killed when troops raided their barracks. On 18 March, the Ottoman parliamentarians came together in a last meeting. A black cloth covered the pulpit of the Parliament as reminder of its absent members and the Parliament sent a letter of protest to the Allies, declaring the arrest of five of its members as unacceptable.

The dissolution of the Ottoman left the Sultan as sole controller of the Empire; without parliament the Sultan stood alone with the British government. Beginning with 18 March, the Sultan followed the directives of the British Foreign Secretary, saying, "There would be no one left to blame for what will be coming soon"; the Sultan revealed his own version of the declaration of dissolution on 11 April, after approximately 150 Turkish politicians accused of war crimes were interned in Malta. The dissolution of the parliament was followed by the raid and closing of the journal Yeni Gün (New Day). Yeni Gün was owned by Yunus Nadi Abalıoğlu, an influential journalist, and was the main media organ in Turkey publishing Turkish news to global audiences.

Official declaration, 16 March 1920
On 16 March 1920, the third day of hostilities, the Allied forces declared the occupation:

Enforcing the peace treaty

Early pressure on the insurgency, April–June 1920
The British argued that the insurgency of the Turkish National Movement should be suppressed by local forces in Anatolia, with the help of British training and arms. In response to a formal British request, the Istanbul government appointed an extraordinary Anatolian general inspector Süleyman Şefik Pasha and a new Security Army, Kuva-i Inzibatiye, to enforce central government control with British support. The British also supported local guerrilla groups in the Anatolian heartland (they were officially called 'independent armies') with money and arms.

Ultimately, these forces were unsuccessful in quelling the nationalist movement. A clash outside İzmit quickly escalated, with British forces opening fire on the nationalists, and bombing them from the air. Although the attack forced the nationalists to retreat, the weakness of the British position had been made apparent. The British commander, General George Milne, asked for reinforcements of at least twenty-seven divisions. However, the British government was unwilling to channel these forces, as a deployment of this size could have had political consequences that were beyond the British government's capacity to handle.

Some Circassian exiles, who had emigrated to the Empire after the Circassian genocide may have supported the British—notably Ahmet Anzavur, who led the Kuva-i Inzibatiye and ravaged the countryside. Others, such as Hüseyin Rauf Orbay, who was of Ubykh descent, remained loyal to Atatürk, and was exiled to Malta in 1920 when British forces took the city. The British were quick to accept the fact that the nationalistic movement, which had hardened during World , could not be faced without the deployment of consistent and well-trained forces. On 25 June the Kuva-i Inzibatiye was dismantled on the advice of the British, as they were becoming a liability.

Presentation of the treaty to the Sultan, June 1920

The treaty terms were presented to the Sultan in the middle of June. The treaty was harsher than anyone expected. However, because of the military pressure placed on the insurgency from April to June 1920, the Allies did not expect that there would be any serious opposition.

In the meantime, however, Mustafa Kemal had set up a rival government in Ankara, with the Grand National Assembly. On 18 October, the government of Damat Ferid Pasha was replaced by a provisional ministry under Ahmed Tevfik Pasha as Grand Vizier, who announced an intention to convoke the Senate with the purpose of ratification of the Treaty, provided that national unity be achieved. This required seeking cooperation with Mustafa Kemal. The latter expressed disdain to the Treaty and started a military assault. As a result, the Turkish Government issued a note to the Entente that the ratification of the Treaty was impossible at that time.

End of the occupation

The success of the Turkish National Movement against the French and Greeks was followed by their forces threatening the Allied forces at Chanak. The British decided to resist any attempt to penetrate the neutral zone of the Straits. Kemal was persuaded by the French to order his forces to avoid any incident at Chanak. Nevertheless, the Chanak Crisis nearly resulted in hostilities, these being avoided on 11 October 1922, when the Armistice of Mudanya was signed, bringing the Turkish War of Independence to an end. The handling of this crisis caused the collapse of David Lloyd George's Ministry on 19 October 1922.

Following the Turkish War of Independence (1919–1922), the Grand National Assembly of Turkey in Ankara abolished the Sultanate on 1 November 1922, and the last Ottoman Sultan, Mehmed VI, was expelled from the city. Leaving aboard the British warship HMS Malaya on 17 November 1922, he went into exile and died in Sanremo, Italy, on 16 May 1926.

Negotiations for a new peace treaty with Turkey began at the Conference of Lausanne on 20 November 1922 and reopened after a break on 23 April 1923. This led to the signing of the Treaty of Lausanne on 24 July 1923. Under the terms of the treaty, Allied forces started evacuating Istanbul on 23 August 1923 and completed the task on 4 October 1923 – British, Italian, and French troops departing pari passu.

Turkish forces of the Ankara government, commanded by Şükrü Naili Pasha (3rd Corps), entered the city with a ceremony on 6 October 1923, which has been marked as the Liberation Day of Istanbul (Turkish: İstanbul'un Kurtuluşu) and is commemorated every year on its anniversary. On 29 October 1923, the Grand National Assembly of Turkey declared the establishment of the Turkish Republic, with Ankara as its capital. Mustafa Kemal Atatürk became the Republic's first President.

List of Allied High Commissioners
:
 November 1918 – 1919: Admiral Somerset Arthur Gough-Calthorpe, also Commander-in-Chief, Mediterranean Fleet
 August 1919 – 1920: Admiral John de Robeck, also Commander-in-Chief, Mediterranean Fleet
 1920 – 22 October 1923: Sir Horace Rumbold (later British ambassador)
:
 November 1918 – January 1919: General Louis Franchet d'Esperey
 30 January 1919 – December 1920: Albert 
 1921 – 22 October 1923: General Maurice Pellé
:
 November 1918 – January 1919: Carlo Sforza
 September 1920 – 22 October 1923: 
:
 1918–1921: 
 1921–1923: Charalambos Simopoulos
:
 August 1919-October 1923: Admiral Mark Lambert Bristol
:
 April 1921-October 1923: Sadatsuchi Uchida

References

Further reading

 Ferudun Ata: The Relocation Trials in Occupied Istanbul, 2018 Manzara Verlag, Offenbach am Main, .
 
 
 
 
 
 
 Bilge Criss, Nur (1999). "Constantinople under Allied Occupation 1918–1923", Brill,  (limited preview).

External links 
 

1910s in Istanbul
1920s in Istanbul
Constantinople
Military occupation
Military history of Istanbul
1918 in the Ottoman Empire
1919 in the Ottoman Empire
1920 in the Ottoman Empire
1921 in the Ottoman Empire
1922 in the Ottoman Empire
1923 in Turkey
British military occupations
French military occupations
1923 in the Ottoman Empire
Turkish War of Independence
Istanbul